Snizort Cathedral (Gaelic: Snìosort) was a small cathedral church located on an island (St Columba's Isle, Gaelic: Eilean Chaluim Chille) in the River Snizort, near the head of Loch Snizort on the Scottish island of Skye. Also referred to as Church of St Columba or Skeabost, it was founded under the authority of the Archbishop of Nidaros (Trondheim) in Norway. Amongst its more famous bishops was Wimund, who according to William of Newburgh became a seafaring warlord adventurer in the years after 1147".

History
According to tradition, the cathedral was founded near a site where Columba had preached from a rock, which later became known as St. Columba's rock. The site may originally have been a pagan Pictish centre, but by the time of Columba's arrival may have converted to a Pictish Christian establishment. Over the early centuries of the 2nd millennium it gained importance as the Kilmuir monastery declined and by the 14th Century was referred to as the Metropolitan Church of the Isles, being the principal seat for the Bishops of the Isles until power was transferred to Iona Abbey. It was extant until at least 1501, but destroyed during the Scottish reformation, although remains are still visible.

References

External links
 RCAHMS page

Snizort
Scheduled Ancient Monuments in Highland
Former churches in Scotland
Tourist attractions in Highland (council area)
Churches in the Isle of Skye